Murchagi (also Romanized as Mūrchagī; also known as Moordak and Mūrjakī) is a village in Rahgan Rural District, Khafr District, Jahrom County, Fars Province, Iran. At the 2006 census, its population was 328, in 66 families.

References 

Populated places in Jahrom County